Arieh Elias (. 1 April 1921 – 7 May 2015) was an Israeli actor.

Biography
Arieh Elias was born in Baghdad. In 1941, he was the first Jew to be accepted to the drama faculty of Baghdad's Academy of Fine Arts. Elias immigrated to   Mandatory Palestine in 1947. He joined the Palmach and fought in the War of Independence. At first he had trouble finding work as an actor due to his pronounced Arabic accent, but his popularity grew after playing the lead in the Israeli film HaYeled Me'ever LaRechov (The Boy Across The Street) in 1965.

Acting and film career
In the early 1960s, he directed the theater troupe of the Frank Sinatra Center in Nazareth, staging Jean d'Arc, Nasser Aladdin and Majnun Night for El-Hadit Theater.

Elias appeared in more than thirty films from 1954 to 2006. In 2013, he won a lifetime achievement award from the Israeli Artists’ Association.

Selected filmography

See also
Theater of Israel
Cinema of Israel
History of the Jews in Iraq

References

External links 

1921 births
2015 deaths
Artists from Baghdad
Israeli male film actors
Israeli male television actors
Israeli male stage actors
Iraqi emigrants to Mandatory Palestine
Israeli people of Iraqi-Jewish descent
Jewish Israeli male actors
Iraqi Jews
20th-century Israeli male actors
21st-century Israeli male actors